Harold B. Sightler was founder of Tabernacle Baptist Church, Christian School, College, Children's Home, Tabernacle Baptist Missions International, WTBI, and Widows Homes in Greenville, South Carolina, United States.

References

1914 births
1995 deaths
American people of German descent
Clergy from Greenville, South Carolina
People from St. George, South Carolina
Independent Baptist ministers from the United States
American radio personalities
American evangelists
American temperance activists
King James Only movement
American Christian creationists
Christian fundamentalists
20th-century Baptist ministers from the United States